Sarah Moyle (born 14 September 1969) is an English actress, known for her roles as Linda Fawcett in various stage productions of Jerusalem and Valerie Pitman in the BBC soap opera Doctors. Moyle also portrayed the recurring role of Caroline Swann in the ITV soap opera Emmerdale. For her role as Valerie in Doctors, Moyle won the award for Best Comedic Performance at the 2019 British Soap Awards.

Career
Moyle trained at Bodywork Dance Studios, has a B.A. in Performance Art from Middlesex University, and studied for six months at State University of New York. From 1988 to 1991, she was a member of National Youth Theatre. Moyle began her career in 1992 with roles in theatre, her first being in Lust at Theatre Royal Haymarket, directed by Bob Carlton. In her early career, Moyle portrayed roles in An Inspector Calls, Oliver!, Les Misérables and My Fair Lady. Her stage career also includes parts in Drowning on Dry Land and Private Fears in Public Places written for her by Sir Alan Ayckbourn. In 2010, Moyle played the role of Linda Fawcett in Jerusalem at the Royal Court Theatre and the Apollo Theatre, before taking it to Broadway at the Music Box Theatre.

In 2012, Moyle was cast in the BBC soap opera Doctors. In 2016, Moyle was nominated for Best Female Dramatic Performance and Best Comedy Performance at the British Soap Awards, but lost out to Lacey Turner and Patti Clare who play Stacey Fowler and Mary Taylor respectively. In 2018, she made her writing debut after writing an episode of Doctors, titled "The Wager", which aired on 31 May 2018. In 2019, Moyle won Best Comedy Performance at the British Soap Awards. In 2020, Moyle wrote another episode of Doctors, titled "Targeted Individual". Moyle announced her decision to leave Doctors in August 2022. Her final episode aired on 16 December 2022.

Personal life
In September 2018, Moyle cycled 282 km across Rwanda to raise money and awareness for Hope and Homes for Children. She is also an advocate for the Alzheimer's Society, and ran the 2000 London Marathon to raise money for the charity. In 2020, Moyle raised money for the charity of which she is patron, Embracing Arts, by cycling 46 miles around London.

Stage

Filmography

Awards and nominations

References

External links
 

1969 births
20th-century English actresses
21st-century English actresses
Living people
English philanthropists
English soap opera actresses
English stage actresses
English television actresses